USS Loyalty may refer to the following ships of the United States Navy:

 , was a coastal minesweeper launched 23 August 1941 and decommissioned 4 December 1945
 , was a minesweeper launched 22 November 1953 and struck 1 July 1972

United States Navy ship names